Neolamprologus mustax is a species of cichlid endemic to Lake Tanganyika.  This species reaches a length of  TL.  It can also be found in the aquarium trade. Individuals are yellow in color and thus resemble juveniles of another cichlid species, Variabilichromis moorii, which may provide N. mustax with greater access to V. moorii feeding territories.

References

mustax
Taxa named by Max Poll
Fish described in 1978
Taxonomy articles created by Polbot